Paul Murdoch (born 3 October 1973) is an Australian former professional boxer who competed from 1998 to 2007. He held the PABA light-heavyweight title twice between 2001 and 2007 and challenged for the WBO and lineal light-heavyweight titles in 2006.

Professional career

Murdoch vs. Erdei 

On 5 May 2006, Murdoch challenged Zsolt Erdei for the WBO and lineal light-heavyweight titles in Düsseldorf, Germany. Erdei dominated the bout, knocking Murdoch down in the eight round before winning in the tenth round by TKO.

Murdoch vs. Green 

On 21 January 2007, Murdoch challenged Danny Green in an unification bout, for Murdoch's PABA light-heavyweight title and Green's IBF Pan Pacific light-heavyweight title. After Green knocked Murdoch down in both the first and second round, Murdoch's corner threw in the towel.
After the loss, Murdoch retired from boxing with excellent career stats, finishing with a record of 26 wins (16 KOs), 7 losses, and 1 draw.

Professional boxing record

References

External links
 

1973 births
Living people
Light-heavyweight boxers
Australian male boxers